Southern Cross Mountains is the name applied to the group of Antarctic mountain ranges lying between the Mariner and Priestley Glaciers in Victoria Land. Seaward parts of this area were first viewed by Ross in 1841 and subsequently by expeditions led by Borchgrevink, Scott, Shackleton and Byrd. The precise mapping of its overall features was accomplished from U.S. Navy air photographs and surveys by New Zealand and American parties in the 1950s and 1960s. Named by the northern party of NZGSAE, 1965–66.

Features
Geographical features of Southern Cross Mountains include:

Arrowhead Range

Other features

 Archambault Ridge
 Aviator Glacier
 Chisholm Hills
 Cosmonette Glacier
 Daughtery Peaks
 Hades Terrace
 Linn Mesa
 Mount Jiracek
 Schulte Hills
 Shoemaker Glacier
 Styx Glacier
 Tinker Glacier
 Vulcan Hills
 Wood Ridge

References

Mountain ranges of Victoria Land
Borchgrevink Coast